Cottage is a parliamentary electoral district in Dominica. It includes the areas of Capuchin, Clifton, Cottage and Lagoon and came into effect in time for the 1975 Dominican general election. It has been represented by Reginald Austrie of the Dominica Labour Party since the 1995 general election.

Constituency profile 
The constituency was established prior to the 1975 Dominican general election. There was an electorate of 2,186 . It includes the areas of Capuchin, Clifton, Cottage and Lagoon. The boundary extends from the sea along the border between Saint John Parish and Saint Andrew Parish to Marne Brules and then to the north river east of Grange and along the river to the sea.

Representatives 
This constituency has elected the following members of the House of Assembly of Dominica:

Election results

Elections in the 2010s

References 

Constituencies of Dominica